Syed Noor-ul-Hassan Bukhari was a Muslim Hanafi Deobandi Scholar, religious and political leader from the Indian subcontinent. He was one of founding members of the Tanzeem-e-Ahlay Sunnat.

Writing and speaking career 
Bukhari wrote historical, educational and religious books, including: 
 Al Ashaab fil kitab
 Kashf ul Haqaiq
 Masaib us Sahabah

References

1904 births
1983 deaths
20th-century Muslim scholars of Islam
Deobandis
Hanafis
People from Rajanpur District